Marisa Maguire Ramirez (born September 15, 1977) is an American actress, known for her work on television soap operas and for her role on the American police procedural television drama series Blue Bloods as Detective Maria Baez.

Early life
 
Ramirez graduated from All Saints Catholic School and then attended an all-girls school in Alhambra, California at Ramona Convent Secondary School. Her career began at age 13 when she was brought to the attention of a major L.A. modeling agency, which led to an international modeling career. After modeling she transitioned into hosting and acting.

Career
Ramirez is known to TV audiences from starring roles on four prime time and two notable daytime series. Currently, she plays NYPD Detective Maria Baez in Blue Bloods and recurred as Officer Riley Dunn in Body of Proof.  In 2011, she was a series regular on Lifetime's Against the Wall, playing Detective Lina Flores. Despite respectable ratings, the series was not renewed for a second season. Immediately prior to landing that role, Ramirez starred as Melitta on Starz's Spartacus: Gods of the Arena, which was filmed in New Zealand.

After several guest appearances on Days of Our Lives and The Bold and the Beautiful, Ramirez finally got her big break in July 2000, when she was cast in the contract role of supermodel Gia Campbell on General Hospital. She left this role in December 2002 to star in the short-lived ABC drama, Miracles. During her time on GH, she was nominated for ALMA and NAACP Awards.

In  she joined the cast of The Young and the Restless as Jabot Cosmetics public relations consultant Carmen Mesta for five months. The character of Carmen was killed off. Ramirez briefly returned to the show in early 2007 as Carmen's cousin, Ines Vargas.

Shortly after, she moved to Colombia to film the Fox summer series Mental, opposite Chris Vance and Annabella Sciorra.

Personal life
Ramirez married Nathan Lavezoli on September 22, 2002, and divorced him in 2011. On January 22, 2016, Ramirez announced she was expecting a baby due in May.  In May 2016, she gave birth to a daughter.

Filmography

Film

Television

Other roles
 In Backstreet Boys video "As Long as You Love Me."
 In Jordan Knight's video "Give It To You."
 In Voices of Theory's video "Wherever You Go."
 In 3T's video "Tease Me."
 Appeared in a commercial for Coca-Cola and Special K.
NKOTB Bring Back The Time

References

External links

1977 births
Living people
American soap opera actresses
Hispanic and Latino American actresses
Actresses from Los Angeles
People from Alhambra, California
American film actresses
American television actresses
20th-century American actresses
21st-century American actresses
American actresses of Mexican descent